Ars dictaminis (or ars dictandi) refers to the art of letter-writing.  The art of letter-writing often intersects with the art of rhetoric.

History of Letter-Writing

Greco-Roman Theory 
Early examples of letter-writing theory can be found in C. Julius Victor's Ars rhetorica and Cassiodorus Senator's Variae epistolae. Other examples can be found in the Pseudo-Demetrius' Typoi epistolikoi, Pseudo-Libanius' Epistolimaioi kharacteres, Demetrius' Peri hermeneias, Philostratus of Lemnos' treatise, and Gregory of Nazianus' Epistle 51.

Latin Middle Ages 
During the Latin medieval period, the standing assumption was that these writings would be composed in Latin, and according to well worked-out models. This made the arts of composition a subfield of rhetoric.

Medieval letter writing developed for ecclesiastical, government, and business purposes.  

Important figures in the early development of Latin letter writing and document composition include Alberic of Monte Cassino (Dictaminum radii, Breviarium), his critic Adalbert of Samaria (Praecepta dictaminum, c. 1120), Hugh of Bologna (Rationes dictandi prosaice, c.1120), Anonymous' Aurea gemma (c.1119), Anonymous' Rationes dictandi (1135), Anonymous' Precepta prosaici dictaminis secundum Tullium (c. 1140), Bernard of Romagna's Introductiones prosaici dictaminis (1145), Anonymous' Ad plenam scientiam dictaminum (c.1140), and Baldwin's Liber de dictaminibus (c.1150).  Lawrence of Aquilegia (Practica sive usus dictaminis, c.1300) is a much later example of the genre.

Letter conventions include some form of address (e.g., “Worshipful master”); salutation (“I greet you well”); notification (“May it please you to know”); exposition (“the wool was shipped”); disposition (“and I want my money”); and valediction (“May God keep you well, at least until my bill is paid”). Clerks and scribes wrote the letters based on those rules.

Early Modern Europe 

Renaissance letter writing, inspired by the rediscovery of Cicero's letters, broaden the scope of letter writing instruction.

See also
 Formulary (model documents)
Chancery
Letter (message)
Victorian Letter Writing Guides
De Conscribendis Epistolis
Ars Grammatica
Homiletics (Ars Praedicandi)

References

Further reading
Martin Camargo: Ars dictaminis, Ars dictandi. Turnhout: Brepols, 1991 (Typologie des sources du Moyen Âge occidental 60).
Martin Camargo: "Ars dictandi, dictaminis." In: Historisches Wörterbuch der Rhetorik I, Tübingen 1992, Sp. 1040-1046.
Janet Luehring and Richard Utz: "Letter Writing in the Late Middle Ages. An Introductory Bibliography of Critical Studies." In: Carol Poster and Richard Utz, eds., The Late Medieval Epistle. Evanston, IL: Northwestern UP, 1996. pp. 191–221.
Florian Hartman, Benoît Grèvin: "Ars dictaminis : Handbuch der mittelalterlichen Briefstillehre". Hiersemann, 2019, Sp. 720.

External links
  Timeline of the ars dictandi
 Makdisi - Scholasticism and Humanism in Classical Islam and the Christian West - page 7
Rhetoric
 Middle Ages